Nirmala may refer to:

People
 Nirmalamma (1920–2009), Indian Telugu film actress
 Nirmala Bhuria, Indian politician in Madhya Pradesh
 Nirmala Chennappa, Indian Kannada film director, theatre actress and producer
 Nirmala Deshpande (1929–2008), Indian social activist
 Nirmala Devi (1927–1996), Indian film actress and Hindustani classical vocalist
 Nirmala Devi (wrestler) (born 1984), Indian freestyle wrestler
 Nirmala Erevelles, American academic, professor at the University of Alabama
 Nirmala Gavit, Indian politician in Maharashtra
 Nirmala Govindarajan, Indian writer and journalist
 Nirmala Joshi (1934–2015), Indian Catholic religious sister
 Nirmala Kotalawala (born 1965), Sri Lankan politician
 Kamini Nirmala Mendis, Sri Lankan malariologist
 Nirmala Panta (2004–2018), Nepalese rape victim
 Nirmala Patwardhan (1928–2007), Indian ceramic artist
 Nirmala Samant Prabhavalkar, Indian politician and mayor of Mumbai
 Nirmala Rajasekar, Indian veena player
 Gaveet Nirmala Ramesh, Indian politician in Maharashtra
 Nirmala Rao (born 1959), British academic, vice-chancellor of the Asian University for Women
 Nirmala Visweswara Rao, Indian classical dancer
 Nirmala S Maurya (born 1958), Indian academic, vice-chancellor of Veer Bahadur Singh Purvanchal University
 Nirmala Sankhwar (born 1969), Indian politician in Uttar Pradesh
 Nirmala Sheoran (born 1995), Indian sprinter
 Nirmala Sitharaman (born 1959), Indian Minister of Finance and Corporate Affairs
 Nirmala Srivastava (1923–2011), founder and guru of Sahaja Yoga
 Nirmala Wadhwani, Indian politician in Gujarat
 Sant Nirmala (fl. 14th century), Maharashtrian sant, sister of Chokhamela
 Sellappan Nirmala (born 1952/53), Indian doctor who discovered the first HIV case in India
 Vennira Aadai Nirmala (born 1948), Indian Tamil, Malayalam and Telugu film actress
 Vijaya Nirmala (born 1946), Indian Telugu film actress and director

Others
 Nirmala (novel), a 1926 novel by Munshi Premchand
 Nirmala (1938 film), an Indian social drama film by Franz Osten
 Nirmala (1948 film), an Indian social drama film by P. V. Krishna Iyer
 Nirmala (sect), a Sikh religious order
 Nirmala (beetle), a genus of beetles in the family Carabidae
 Nirmala UI, an Indic writing system font on Microsoft Windows
 Nirmala Bhavan Higher Secondary School, a Catholic private school in Thiruvananthapuram, Kerala, India
 Nirmala Convent High School, a Catholic private school in Nashik, Maharashtra, India